Golden Hits may refer to:

 Lady of the Stars by Donovan, packaged as Golden Hits, 1996
 The Drifters' Golden Hits, a 1968 compilation album by American doo wop/R&B vocal group The Drifters
 Golden Hits – 15 Hits of Pat Boone, a 1967 greatest hits album by Pat Boone
 The Magic of Boney M. – 20 Golden Hits, a 1980 greatest hits album by Boney M.
 Golden Hits (Demis Roussos album), 1975
 Golden Hits of the Smothers Brothers, Vol. 2, the Smothers Brothers' first greatest hits album
 The Golden Hits of Sandie Shaw, a compilation album by 1960s British singer Sandie Shaw
 Golden Hits of the Four Seasons, 1963
 Golden Hits (Turtles album), 1967
 Golden Hits (Westlife album)